Fingers is a studio album by Brazilian jazz drummer and percussionist Airto Moreira, credited simply as Airto. It was released on CTI Records in 1973. It peaked at number 18 on the Billboard Jazz Albums chart.

Critical reception

Alex Henderson of AllMusic gave the album 4.5 out of 5 stars, calling it "consistently enriching." He added, "Fingers is an album to savor."

Track listing

Personnel
Credits adapted from liner notes.

 Airto – drums, percussion, vocals
 Hugo Fattoruso – keyboards, harmonica, vocals
 David Amaro – acoustic guitar, electric guitar
 Ringo Thielmann – double bass, vocals
 Jorge Osvaldo Fattoruso – drums, vocals
 Flora Purim – percussion, vocals
 Creed Taylor – production
 Rudy Van Gelder – engineering
 Pete Turner – photography
 Alen MacWeeney – photography
 Rob Ciano – design

Charts

References

External links
 

1973 albums
Airto Moreira albums
CTI Records albums
Albums produced by Creed Taylor
Albums recorded at Van Gelder Studio